Lappin is a surname. Notable people with the surname include:

People
Harry Lappin (1879–1925), English footballer
Jessica Lappin (born 1975), Democratic New York City Councilwoman
Lauren Lappin (born 1984), American softball player, Olympic silver medallist
Linda Lappin (born 1953), poet, novelist, and translator from Tennessee
Matthew Lappin (born 1976), Australian rules footballer
Nigel Lappin (born 1976), former professional Australian rules footballer
Peter Lappin (born 1965), professional ice hockey player
Ryan Lappin, Australian television personality and musician
Simon Lappin (born 1983), Scottish professional footballer

See also
Robert I. Lappin Charitable Foundation, Jewish non-profit organization that operates programs for Jewish youth